The Empire City Gold Cup was an American Thoroughbred horse race first run in 1947 and 1948 at Belmont Park then at Jamaica Race Course from 1949 through 1953 as a race created for horses age three and older. With its lucrative $100,000 purse, it was promoted as an international event in an effort to attract horses from Europe and South America. Run in October or early November it was contested on dirt at a distance of 1 5/8 miles which made it best suited for stayers.

Winners and Losers
While a short-lived event, the Empire City Gold Cup attracted some of the best horses of the era. The inaugural race in 1947 was won by Stymie, a future U.S. Racing Hall of Fame inductee who was voted #41 on the Blood-Horse magazine List of the Top 100 U.S. Racehorses of the 20th Century. Among the seven starters were two from South America. The following year Citation came into the 1948 edition of the Empire City Gold Cup as that year's U.S. Triple Crown winner. Citation would be voted that year's U.S. Horse of the Year, become a Hall of Fame member, and be voted #3 on the Blood-Horse magazine List of the Top 100 U.S. Racehorses of the 20th Century. 1952 winner One Count would also go on to earn American Horse of the Year honors that year. In its final running on October 31, 1953, Crafty Admiral, the American Champion Older Male Horse of 1952, won by 10 Lengths.

Prominent horses beaten in the Empire City Gold Cup includes 1946 Triple Crown winner Assault was ran third behind winner Stymie and runnerup Natchez. Christopher Chenery's Hill Prince, the 1950 American Horse of the Year and a future U.S. Racing Hall of Fame inductee, ran second to Sonny Whitney's Counterpoint in the 1951 race.
 Phalanx, the 1947 American Champion Three-Year-Old Male Horse and that year's Belmont Stakes winner was no match for Citation and finished second by two lengths.

Records
Speed record:
 2:42 3/5 @ 1 miles (1947)

Most wins:
 no horse won this race more than once

Most wins by a jockey:
 2 - Eddie Arcaro (1948, 1950)
 2 - Dave Gorman (1951, 1952)

Most wins by a trainer:
 2 - Oscar White (1949, 1952)

Most wins by an owner:
 2 - Sarah F. Jeffords (1949, 1952)

Winners

References

Open long distance horse races
Discontinued horse races in New York (state)
Belmont Park
Jamaica Race Course
Recurring sporting events established in 1947
Recurring sporting events disestablished in 1953
1947 establishments in New York (state)
1953 disestablishments in New York (state)